"Mountain of Love" is a song written by Harold Dorman. Dorman released his version as a single in 1960. It was originally recorded in late 1959 at the Royal Recording Studios in Memphis before the backing vocals (and strings, much later) were overdubbed. It performed well, spending 19 weeks on the Billboard Hot 100 chart, peaking at #21 in May 1960, while reaching #7 on the Billboard Hot R&B Sides chart, and #25 on Canada's "CHUM Hit Parade". The song was his only top forty hit on the Billboard Hot 100 and was the highest-charting single of his career.

Charley Pride version

In December 1981, Charley Pride released a cover version, which topped the Billboard Hot Country Singles chart in March 1982. Charley Pride's version of "Mountain of Love" was his twenty-sixth #1 on the country chart.

Charts

Weekly charts

Year-end charts

Other cover versions
Other artists to record the song include:

In 1960, Kenny Lynch released a cover of the song, which reached #33 on the United Kingdom's Record Retailer chart.
In 1964, Johnny Rivers released his remake using members of The Wrecking Crew as a single. This version also proved popular, charting at #9 on the Billboard Hot 100.

In 1968, singer Ronnie Dove had a minor hit when he released his version as the B-side of "Never Gonna Cry (The Way I'll Cry Tonight)" on Diamond Records. Ronnie Dove's version spent 6 weeks on the Billboard Hot 100, and reached #67.  This recording featured A-list session musicians, such as Boots Randolph on saxophone and Glen Campbell on guitar.  It was originally issued as an album track on Ronnie Dove Sings the Hits for You two years earlier, and was the original B-side of this single.
The Beach Boys recorded an acoustic rendition of the song for their 1965 album Beach Boys' Party!.
Tommy Cash
Narvel Felts
Jerry Lawson and Talk of the Town (on their 2007 album, Jerry Lawson & Talk of the Town). Bobby G. Rice took a rendition to #20 on the country music charts in 1971. 
A cover by Molly & the Heymakers peaked at #79 on the RPM'' Country Tracks chart in Canada in 1992. 
Bruce Springsteen has covered the song live twelve times since 1975.

References

1960 singles
1964 singles
1968 singles
1982 singles
Charley Pride songs
The Beach Boys songs
Johnny Rivers songs
Bobby G. Rice songs
Molly & the Heymakers songs
Songs written by Harold Dorman
Song recordings produced by Lou Adler
Imperial Records singles
Song recordings produced by Norro Wilson
RCA Records singles
1959 songs
Kenny Lynch songs
The Crickets songs